John Hughes (born 18 February 1942) is a Welsh former footballer who played for Chester in The Football League.

Hughes was born in Prestatyn. He joined Chester from Rhyl in the summer of 1962 and was one of nine new signings in the side for Chester's opening game of 1962–63 at Gillingham. He again wore the number nine shirt in their second game of the season at Darlington, but did not play for the club again.

Bibliography

References

1942 births
Welsh footballers
People from Prestatyn
Sportspeople from Denbighshire
Living people
English Football League players
Association football forwards
Rhyl F.C. players
Chester City F.C. players